The Esperantic Studies Foundation, abbreviated ESF is a non-profit organisation initiated in 1968 by Jonathan Pool, E. James Lieberman and Humphrey Tonkin, with the aim to further the understanding and practice of linguistic justice in a multicultural world, with a special focus on the study of interlinguistics and the role of Esperanto.

Under the banner "For linguistic justice in a multicultural world," ESF supports education and research programs that promote linguistic justice and equality. ESF aims to create environments in which languages are treated as equal and communication occurs in a non-discriminatory manner and to develop and support excellence in scholarship, education and interlingual communication. Its priorities and values are shaped through engagement with the worldwide community of Esperanto speakers, as well as with researchers, educators and activists in many language-related fields. ESF's current president is Humphrey Tonkin.

The interlinguistic support fund 
Together with the Center for Research and Documentation (CED), Foundation to support Esperanto and interlinguistics, ESF (Esperantic Studies Foundation) invites proposals for research grants to assist scholars and graduate students in conducting and publishing research in such fields as language planning, interlinguistics, transnational language policy, linguistic justice, and 'planned languages' (including Esperanto)

ESF has funded hundreds of different projects including the development of the educational websites lernu.net, a website to learn Esperanto and edukado.net, a website for teachers and learners of Esperanto, Tekstaro.com, a text corpus of Esperanto, Summer Esperanto Workshop in Europe (SES), North American Summer Esperanto Institute (NASK) to promote the continued study of Esperanto in the United States. ESF continues to support the Esperanto edition of UNESCO Courier, the Conference on the Application of Esperanto in Science and Technology (KAEST), as well as the postgraduate studies of interlinguistics and esperantology at Adam Mickiewicz University in Poznan, Poland and the Chair of Esperanto and Interlinguistics at the University of Amsterdam.

ESF sponsors also a number of other events, including the Nitobe Symposia, a conference series on world language problems that bring together activists, academics and politicians. as well as a series of symposia on language and development in New York aimed at raising the awareness of the United Nations about the importance of language equality for human development and human rights.

ESF also sponsored the creation of the documentary film The Universal Language, produced the video course Esperanto-Pasporto al la Tuta Mondo (available on YouTube),

ESF also helped to establish official Esperanto examinations in accordance with the Common European Framework of Reference for Languages.

Esperanto "Access To Language Education" Award 
Esperantic Studies Foundation, Lernu.net and CALICO (Computer Assisted Language Instruction Consortium), yearly present the Esperanto "Access To Language Education" Award, abbreviated ALE Award for the best non-commercial website offering outstanding resources for language learning.

See also 
Interlinguistics

Esperantology

References

External links 
 
 Lernu!
 CALICO

Foundations based in Canada
Esperanto organizations
Esperanto in Canada
Esperanto
Interlinguistics
International auxiliary languages